Events from the year 1866 in Russia.

Incumbents
 Monarch – Alexander II

Events

 Daugavpils–Indra Railway
 Delo (magazine)
 Ekostrovskaya Volost
 Kalinin Machine-Building Plant
 Moscow Criminal Investigations Department
 South Eastern Railway (Russia)
 Swedish Theatre
Alexander III marries Maria Sophie Feodorovna of Denmark

Births
 - Dmitri Parsky, general (d. 1921)
 - Wassily Kandinsky, artist. (d. 1944)

Deaths
 - Mikhail Petrashevsky, Russian revolutionary and Utopian theorist. (b. 1821)
 Maria Ikonina, ballerina. (b. 1788)

References

1866 in Russia
Years of the 19th century in the Russian Empire